The Path is an American drama streaming television series created by Jessica Goldberg, and starring Aaron Paul, Michelle Monaghan, and Hugh Dancy.  The show portrays members of a fictional religion known as Meyerism.

The series was ordered by Hulu in March 2015, with a straight 10-episode order, and debuted on March 30, 2016. Its original title, The Way,  was changed to The Path in September 2015, due to its similarity to that of the real-life ministry and alleged cult, The Way International.

On May 4, 2016, Hulu renewed the series for a second season, which premiered on January 25, 2017. On April 12, 2017, Hulu renewed the series for a 13-episode third season, which premiered on January 17, 2018. On April 23, 2018, Jessica Goldberg announced via Twitter that The Path would not be renewed for a fourth season.

Premise
Eddie Lane lives in Upstate New York with his wife, Sarah, and their two children, Hawk and Summer. They are all members of the Meyerist Movement, which combines aspects of New Age philosophy, shamanism, Scientology, Christian mysticism, and Utopianism with a few elements from the Shakers, Sufism, Tibetan Buddhism, Jehovah's Witnesses and Freemasonry rituals.

Eddie returns from Peru, where he had undergone a spiritual retreat designed to advance him further up Meyerism's spiritual ladder.  Unbeknownst to his family, Eddie experienced a revelation while in Peru which causes him to question his faith in Meyerism. Meanwhile, Cal Roberts, a friend of Sarah's and one of Meyerism's top leaders, is looking to expand the group's influence and deal with the imminent death of their founder, Doctor Stephen Meyer.

Meyerism
Meyerism is a fictional movement founded by Stephen Meyer. In the show's mythology, on October 28, 1974, Meyer literally climbed a ladder of burning light atop Huayna Picchu to receive the message of universal truth. He then gave to his followers the instructions for their spiritual development, written in the first book of Meyerism, The Ladder.

Meyerists believe that all people are damaged, which is the cause of the world's suffering. Through personal enlightenment, they seek to become aware of suffering in themselves and others, and to heal the world, caring deeply about family, humanity, and the environment. In this way and others, they create here on earth the heavenly Garden of Meyer's vision. However, The Ladder foretells that their efforts will be thwarted by non-believers or Ignorant Systemites (I.S.), whose selfish actions will result in an apocalypse; but those who ascend The Ladder of Enlightenment will live forever in The Garden.

The Movement claims 6000 members and has facilities located in San Diego, California, and Parksdale, New York, and a retreat center located in Cusco, Peru. Throughout the series, particularly emphasized in season 3, the movement expands to additional cities and countries. Most members practice Meyerism in their everyday lives and live off-site, while others live in Meyerist intentional communities, have taken vows of service, and dedicate themselves to counseling, recruitment, and outreach programs. However, the founder, Stephen Meyer, warned against media attention and advised that the movement should remain small and publicity should be kept to a minimum.

Spiritual progress is evaluated on an ascending series of rungs from 1R to 10R, and many decisions are made by the senior membership (i.e., Upper Rungs (U.R.'s)).

Meyerists practice meditation, and use biofeedback devices and drugs—including ayahuasca and cannabis—to aid in reaching deeper levels of consciousness. They put considerable stock in visions and intuition, which are believed to be The Light communicating with them.

A Vanity Fair analysis of the show's first episode describes Meyerism as "inspired by a grab bag of religious practices and cult beliefs". The show's creator, Jessica Goldberg, specifically refutes comparisons to Scientology.

Cast and characters

Main
 Aaron Paul as Eddie Lane: A convert to Meyerism with a wayward past. Eddie suffers a crisis of faith when all that he has come to accept as truth is fundamentally challenged.
 Hugh Dancy as Calvin "Cal" Roberts: The charismatic, unofficial leader of The Meyerist Movement. His ambition puts him at odds with the organization's existing leadership, and roils Sarah and Eddie's already turbulent marriage. 
 Michelle Monaghan as Sarah Lane (née Armstrong): Born into a Meyerist family, Sarah's compassion and authority have made her an important figure in The Movement. Her devotion, however, is tested when she uncovers her husband's falsehoods.
 Emma Greenwell as Mary Cox: An addict who's been saved by Cal and a team of Meyerists after a tornado leveled her hometown. Now freed from a life of abuse, she becomes infatuated with Cal and devotes herself entirely to The Movement.
 Rockmond Dunbar as Agent Abe Gaines (seasons 1–2): An FBI investigator who seems to be the only agent suspicious of the mysterious religious sect that recently responded to a natural disaster. As he delves deeper into the investigation, he faces personal troubles at home and is forced to reflect on his own faith.
 Kyle Allen as Hawk Lane: Eddie and Sarah's devoted teenage son who wants to drop out of high school, where he is constantly attacked for his Meyerist faith, and join The Movement full-time. His loyalty wavers when a popular classmate pursues a relationship with him.
 Amy Forsyth as Ashley Fields (starring season 1; recurring season 2): A popular girl at Hawk's school who would normally have nothing to do with "a weird cult kid". After a financial crisis hits home, she turns to Hawk and his family for help.
 Sarah Jones as Alison Kemp (season 1): A defector from Meyerism who holds The Movement responsible for the mysterious death of her husband. She employs Eddie's help in a search for answers and redemptions.
 Paul James as Sean Egan (recurring season 1, starring season 2): A novice member of the Meyerist Movement who begins to date Mary when she joins the Movement. Sean's sister was shot and killed in a school shooting, which led him to join the Movement.
 Freida Pinto as Vera Stephans (season 3): Eddie's publicist.

Recurring

 Raúl Esparza as Jackson Neill
 Clark Middleton as Richard
 Minka Kelly as Miranda Frank
 Keir Dullea as Stephen Meyer
 Peter Friedman as Hank Armstrong 
 Deirdre O'Connell as Gab Armstrong
 Brian Stokes Mitchell as Bill
 Adriane Lenox as Felicia
 Patch Darragh as Russel Armstrong
 Ali Ahn as Nicole Armstrong
 Stephanie Hsu as Joy Armstrong
 Allison Layman as Shelby
 Steve Mones as Silas
 Kathleen Turner as Brenda Roberts
 Aimee Laurence as Summer Lane
 James Remar as Kodiak
 Britne Oldford as Noa
 Michael Countryman as John Ridge
 Kaili Vernoff as Kerry Ridge
 Matt Bailey as Mark Penetti
 Max Ehrich as Freddie Ridge
 Jeb Brown as Wesley Cox
 Leven Rambin as Chloe Jones
 Whitney Crowder as Betsy
 Ali Marsh as Meg Fields
 Kaili Vernoff as Kerry Ridge
 Alexa Landeau as Tessa
 Vincent Kartheiser as Congressman Buck Harbaugh
 Titus Makin Jr. as Caleb Matthews
 Sam Atlas as Kid in Tank

Episodes

Series overview

Season 1 (2016)

Season 2 (2017)

Season 3 (2018)

Production

The Path was shot at Haven Studios NY, located in Mount Vernon, New York.
The Meyerist compound was shot on location in Nyack, New York, re-dressed with influences from kibbutz living, collective farming, and production designer Russell Barnes's experiences being raised on an island with limited resources. The two-story Lane home was built on a soundstage.  Almost all of the Peru scenes were shot in the area, including a New York state park used for a mountaintop scene with subtropical plants concealing uncleared snow. The City Center is "played" by the Church House of the Flatbush Reformed Dutch Church Complex. The New Brunswick scenes in "Mercy" were filmed in Greenport, Long Island. Jean-Paul's palatial home and estate in "The Gardens of Giverny" were "played" by the Oheka Castle on Long Island.

The Eye symbol, central to Meyerist branding and given dominance in many interiors, was based on tribal, Egyptian, and modern art, with a rising sun overlaid to show hopefulness for a new day. Series creator Jessica Goldberg describes the Eye's symbolism as a duality of enlightenment and paranoia, meaning on one hand  "your eyes have been opened, and now you've seen the truth", and on the other, "you're always being watched". While preparing to shoot a scene in a Westchester County storefront dressed as a Meyerist recruitment office, passers-by would come in—curious about the Eye on posters, books, brochures, etc.—wondering what the movement was and how they could join.

Accolades

Reception
The first season of The Path has received positive reviews from critics. On the review aggregator, Metacritic, the first season scored 70 out of 100, based on 33 reviews. On Rotten Tomatoes, season 1 has an approval rating of 78% based on 50 reviews, with an average rating of 7.26/10. The website's critical consensus is, "With strong performances, deep writing, and skilled direction, The Path offers an absorbing observation of the human condition, even if a rushed pace occasionally blunts the impact."

The second season also received generally positive reviews from critics. On Metacritic, the season scored 64 out of 100, based on eight reviews. On Rotten Tomatoes, season 2 has an approval rating of 75% based on 12 reviews, with an average rating of 7.22/10. The website's critical consensus is, "The Path struggles with occasionally logy pacing in its second season, but an expanded canvas and heightened stakes – along with overall solid performances – make the end results worth watching."

Tim Goodman of The Hollywood Reporter reacted positively to the series, writing: "There's a lot to like about The Path, from the strong visual sense of place that director Mike Cahill established in the first two episodes to its theoretical take on faith, and of course the exquisite acting and deft writing." Hank Stuever of the Washington Post wrote: "The Path works best as an intense psychological study of an extended family whose members equate faith and loyalty with happiness." Alan Sepinwall of HitFix had a more critical reaction to the series. He called the show a "dry, claustrophobic show, with not enough of a narrative hook to pull the viewer through hour after hour of it."

Controversy
Residents of Marysville, Washington called the show "insensitive" for "exploiting" the October 24, 2014 shooting at Marysville Pilchuck High School. Episode 2 referred to the shooting in order to develop Sean's backstory. The insult, they say, was that the show's writers changed the real events by giving the shooting a racial motive (the character stated that the shooting was due to "the color of their skin"). In reality, however the murder-suicide of the Tulalip Native American student Jaylen Fryberg was personally motivated and did not involve African Americans. , Hulu and the show's writers had not responded to this.

In April 2017, following the announcement that Hulu had picked up the show for a third season, actor Rockmond Dunbar was abruptly told that his contract would not be renewed. Speaking about it with The Hollywood Reporter, he called the decision "not a healthy way to do business".

See also
List of original programs distributed by Hulu

References

External links
 
 

2010s American drama television series
2016 American television series debuts
2018 American television series endings
English-language television shows
Hulu original programming
New religious movements in popular culture
Serial drama television series
Television series by Universal Television